"How to Touch a Girl" is a song by American singer JoJo from her second studio album, The High Road (2006). It was released in the United States only as the album's second single on November 14, 2006. Written by JoJo, Billy Steinberg, and Josh Alexander and produced by Steinberg and Alexander, it was the first single of JoJo's career on which she is credited as a writer. The song makes a lyrical reference to Whitney Houston's 1985 song "Saving All My Love for You" in its bridge.

Critical reception
The song was well received by critics. Chuck Taylor of Billboard said that "'How to Touch a Girl' again casts the youngster with a crafty melody, albeit strikingly similar in structure to the previous hit. Despite the bizarre, almost perverse title, this track could propel the burgeoning talent all the way." In a review of The High Road, Bill Lamb called the song "a near perfect piece of teen pop."

Chart performance
"How to Touch a Girl" failed to chart on the US Billboard Hot 100, becoming JoJo's second single to miss the chart after 2005's "Not That Kinda Girl". The single did, however, peak at number four on the Bubbling Under Hot 100 Singles chart and at number 76 on the Billboard Pop 100. It also reached 46 on the Pop 100 Airplay component chart of the latter in early 2007.

Music video
The music video, directed by Syndrome, premiered on MTV's TRL on December 7, 2006, and on BET's 106 & Park on January 16, 2007. The video shows clips of JoJo sitting in a room filled with old vinyl records, sitting on a staircase, and singing on a Los Angeles rooftop at sunset. There are also scenes of her in an apartment in a green dress; special effects allow JoJo to be seen multiple times in the same shot. There is also a storyline involving a young couple on a date. Near the end of the video, a boy played by Cody Longo, seemingly her boyfriend, meets JoJo in her room with the albums, and the two embrace.

Track listing
US promotional CD single
"How to Touch a Girl" (Radio Edit) – 4:02
"How to Touch a Girl" (Instrumental) – 4:30
"How to Touch a Girl" (Call Out Hook) – 0:42

Charts

References

2000s ballads
2006 singles
2006 songs
Blackground Records singles
Contemporary R&B ballads
JoJo (singer) songs
Pop ballads
Song recordings produced by Billy Steinberg
Songs written by Billy Steinberg
Songs written by JoJo (singer)
Songs written by Josh Alexander
Universal Music Group singles